Henry Newman may refer to:

 Henry Newman (cricketer) (1907–1988), Australian cricketer
 Henry Newman (football coach) (born 1989), English association football coach
 Henry Newman (Medal of Honor) (1845–1915), German-born soldier in the U.S. Army and Medal of Honor recipient
 Henry Newman (political adviser), British political adviser
 Harry Newman (politician) (1839–1904), French-born Australian politician
 Henry Stanley Newman (1837–1912), grocer, Quaker philanthropist, and author

See also 
 John Henry Newman (1801–1890), English cardinal
 Harry Newman (disambiguation) 
 Henry Neumann (born 1950), Puerto Rican politician